10 Medium Regiment is part of the Regiment of Artillery of the Indian Army.

Formation 
The regiment was raised on 25 September 1954 at Firozpur. It was formed to make for the shortage of artillery units after independence. 5 East Punjab Frontier (EPF) Militia Battalion located near Thakurpur, Gurdaspur was re-organised as 77 Field Battery Border Scouts. Similarly, 11 and 4 EPF Militia Battalions were re-organised as 78 and 79 Field Battery Border Scouts. In August 1954, the three batteries were brought together to form 10 Field Regiment. Lieutenant Colonel Cyril Anthony Lobo from 9 Field Regiment was sent to become the first commanding officer on 27 October 1954. The regiment converted to a medium regiment in 2010.

Class composition
At the time of its raising, the regiment was changed to an ‘All India All Class’ composition, recruiting troops from all parts of the country. In 1960, the regiment was changed to a fixed class composition – 77 battery – Sikhs, 78 battery – Ahirs and 79 battery – Brahmins. The regiment reverted to its ‘All India All Class’ composition in 1999.

Equipment
Following its conversion to a medium regiment in 2010, the regiment has been equipped with 130 mm guns.

Operations
The regiment has taken part in the following operations –
Operation Vijay – The regiment took part in the operations to liberate Goa from Portuguese rule in 1961.
Sino-Indian War

Operation Blue Star – The regiment was responsible for maintaining law and order in Muktsar during the operations.

Operation Trident 

Operation Parakram – The regiment took active part in the operation and its guns saw action against the Pakistani army.

 The regiment has taken part in counter insurgency operations near the Line of Control.

Honours and achievements
The regiment had the honour to be part of the President’s guard in December 2013.
The regiment has produced two Director Generals of Artillery, three Lieutenant Generals, six Major Generals and 12 Brigadiers.

Regimental Insignia 
As the regiment traces its history from the border scouts, it retains the Garuda as its regimental insignia.

See also
List of artillery regiments of Indian Army

References

Military units and formations established in 1954
Artillery regiments of the Indian Army after 1947